The B-300 is a reusable man-portable anti-tank weapon system developed by Israel Military Industries in the late 1970s for use by the Israel Defense Forces. Pre-packaged munitions and simple operating mechanisms make the weapon quite versatile, permitting use by airborne, motorized, and ground troops alike. When defence publications first heard reports of the B-300 in the early 1980s, various reports stated in error that it was an Israeli improved and manufactured version of the Russian RPG-7.

Usage
Munitions used by the B-300 are propelled by a solid rocket motor, and can be equipped with one of two warhead variants. The first, high-explosive anti-tank round, provides specialized support for anti-tank missions. The second, known as a high-explosive follow-through round, is designed for use against fortified targets or enemy units behind cover. A primary charge punches a hole through the protective structure, allowing a secondary anti-personnel charge to pass through and detonate within the building. The B-300 was produced during the 1980s and entered service in limited quantities within Israeli Defence Forces SF units.

Further development

SMAW

The Shoulder-launched Multipurpose Assault Weapon (SMAW) is a shoulder-launched rocket weapon, designed by McDonnell Douglas, with the primary function of being a portable anti-armor rocket launcher. It entered service in the U.S. Marine Corps in 1984. It has a maximum range of 500 m against a tank-sized target.

Shipon

During the late 1990s, IMI introduced the Shipon, an advanced disposable multi-purpose shoulder-launched rocket system consisting of a launch tube and FCS module. The Shipon includes an advanced fire-control system, helping to aim and increasing effective range to 600 meters. The Shipon fires two types of rockets: HEAA Tandem, which penetrates 800 mm of steel armor after explosive reactive armor, and a bunker-buster rocket. The Shipon is in service within Israeli Special Forces units in the IDF and the YAMAM (the elite police counter-terror unit).

Operators

Current operators
 
 
 
 
 
 
 
 
  Used under the designation Mk153 SMAW.

References

Anti-tank rockets
Weapons of Israel
Military equipment introduced in the 1980s